Stoyan Petkov (born 9 June 1935) is a Bulgarian boxer. He competed in the men's bantamweight event at the 1960 Summer Olympics. At the 1960 Summer Olympics, he lost to Jerry Armstrong of the United States.

References

1935 births
Living people
Bulgarian male boxers
Olympic boxers of Bulgaria
Boxers at the 1960 Summer Olympics
People from Montana, Bulgaria
Bantamweight boxers